The 1812 United States presidential election in New York took place between October 30 and December 2, 1812, as part of the 1812 United States presidential election. The state legislature chose 29 representatives, or electors to the Electoral College, who voted for President and Vice President.

During this election, New York cast its 29 electoral votes to Independent Democratic Republican and Federalist supported candidate DeWitt Clinton, who was then currently serving as the Mayor of New York City and the Lieutenant Governor of New York.

The election ultimately hinged on both New York and neighboring Pennsylvania, and while Clinton was able to take his home state, he failed to take Pennsylvania and thus lost the election to traditional Democratic Republican candidate and incumbent President James Madison won by a narrow margin. This would be the first time New York would vote for a losing presidential candidate. It would also be the only time that happened until 1856.

1812 was the first US presidential election where New York State was the most populous state in the nation, after overtaking Virginia in population total in 1810. New York would remain the most populous state in the nation until 1962, when overtaken by California.

See also
 United States presidential elections in New York

Notes

References

New York
1812
1812 New York (state) elections